This is a list of the National Register of Historic Places listings in Clinton County, Iowa.

This is intended to be a complete list of the properties and districts on the National Register of Historic Places in Clinton County, Iowa, United States. Latitude and longitude coordinates are provided for many National Register properties and districts; these locations may be seen together in a map.

There are 30 properties and districts listed on the National Register in the county, including one National Historic Landmark.

Current listings

|}

Former listings

|}

See also

 List of National Historic Landmarks in Iowa
 National Register of Historic Places listings in Iowa
 Listings in neighboring counties: Carroll (IL), Cedar, Jackson, Jones, Rock Island (IL), Scott, Whiteside (IL)

References

Clinton
Buildings and structures in Clinton County, Iowa